Khamsum Yulley Namgyal Chörten (also known as Nyizergang Chörten and Punakha Zangdopelri) — chörten in the Punakha District, Bhutan.

 This chörten (stupa) was built in 2004 by HM The Queen Mother, Ashi Tshering Yangdon Wangchuck, in Nyizergang — about a thirty-minute walk uphill from the footbridge in Yepaisa Village. 
 It was built in accordance with the instructions of Lopon Sonam Zangpo, with the intention of bringing peace in the world in general, and to clear obstacles for the country of Bhutan in particular. 
 Its exterior is in the form of a pagoda like stupa while the interior consists of four stories containing images of the deities of mandalas of Vajarakilaya. 
 Bartsham Lama Kunzang Wangdi, popularly known as Lama Nyingkula, a close disciple of Dudjom Rinpoche was in charge of the construction of this chörten.

Stupas in Bhutan
Punakha District
2004 in Bhutan
Religious buildings and structures completed in 2004